Erin Kelly (born August 21, 1981) is an American film, theater and television actress, best known for her role as Annabelle Tillman in Katherine Brooks' 2006 film Loving Annabelle.

Career

Kelly has collaborated with director Katherine Brooks on three films. Kelly was the title role in Brooks' Finding Kate and Loving Annabelle. Brooks' 2009 feature Waking Madison (starring Sarah Roemer and Elisabeth Shue) saw Kelly taking her darkest role to date as Grace, a mental patient with an addictive personality.

Since 2009, Kelly has her own production company, Rock Rose Entertainment, through which she later launched Hitching Post Theatre and the Indie Colorado Cinema Experience (ICCE), showcasing Colorado films. Kelly is currently the Artistic Director of the BolderLife Festival, a joint venture between Rock Rose Entertainment and the Bolder Media Group.

In 2013 Kelly was a BolderLife Festival's panelist in the 2013 Special Panel of Women in Television, Film and Fashion, with Jessica Clark.

Television
From 2006–2007, Kelly played a recurring character (also named Erin) in the Hawaii surfer drama Beyond the Break. The show was filmed on location in Oahu, Hawaii.

Theater
Kelly has studied improvisation at the Upright Citizen's Brigade since 2006. She co-founded the LA Cafe Plays series at the Ruskin Group Theater, where writers, actors and directors start creating a play at 9 a.m. and must perform it by 7:30 pm. Kelly's Loving Annabelle cohorts Katherine Brooks and Jake Newton have performed with the series.

Also with the Ruskin Group Theater, Kelly has appeared in The Vagina Monologues and Picasso at the Lapin Agile.

In Denver, Colorado, Kelly played lead roles in several theatrical productions, including:
The Miracle Worker (Helen Keller)
The Sound of Music (Maria)
Oliver! (Fegan)
Hansel and Gretel (Gretel)

Personal life
Kelly was born in San Diego and raised in Boulder, Colorado. Her younger brother Jason Kelly is a singer. In several interviews, Kelly thanks her family for supporting her career (including her lesbian-themed films). She likes to surf, sail and hike.

Kelly graduated from New York City's Marymount Manhattan College in 2000 (earning a BA in Acting). She has also studied with the Meisner Technique School since moving to Los Angeles.

Filmography

References

External links
 
 

1981 births
Actresses from San Diego
American film actresses
American stage actresses
American television actresses
Living people
Marymount Manhattan College alumni
21st-century American women